Eslamabad (also Romanized as Eslāmābād) is a village in Shonbeh Rural District, Shonbeh and Tasuj District, Dashti County, Bushehr Province, Iran. At the 2006 census, its population was 59, in 13 families.

References 

Populated places in Dashti County